Roma United Sports Club is a football club based in George Town, Cayman Islands, which currently plays in the Cayman Premier League. It was formed in 2002 after a merger between Roma International and Soweto.

Achievements
 Cayman Islands Digicel Cup:
 2007–08

 President Cup Champions 2015–16

References

Football clubs in the Cayman Islands
Association football clubs established in 2002
2002 establishments in the Cayman Islands
George Town, Cayman Islands